Charles Tompkins may refer to:

 Charles Henry Tompkins (1830–1915), Union Army colonel
 Charles Hook Tompkins (1883–1956), president and co-founder of the Charles H. Tompkins Construction Company